In Your House 11: Buried Alive (Buried Alive: In Your House) was the 11th In Your House professional wrestling pay-per-view (PPV) event produced by the World Wrestling Federation (WWF, now WWE). It took place on October 20, 1996, at the Market Square Arena in Indianapolis, Indiana. The event comprised five matches shown on pay-per-view as well as three dark matches.

The main event was a Buried Alive match between The Undertaker and Mankind, which was the first-ever Buried Alive match held by the WWF. On the undercard, Sid faced Vader in a match to determine the #1 contender for the WWF World Heavyweight Championship, and Marc Mero defended the Intercontinental Championship against Goldust. This was the first WWF pay-per-view in which the reigning world champion did not compete on-air on the show.

With the launch of the WWE Network in 2014, this show became available on demand, but did not include the three dark matches. However, the Shawn Michaels vs. Goldust match was included in the Attitude Era Unreleased DVD and Blu-ray release in 2017.

Production

Background
In Your House was a series of monthly pay-per-view (PPV) shows first produced by the World Wrestling Federation (WWF, now WWE) in May 1995. They aired when the promotion was not holding one of its then-five major PPVs (WrestleMania, King of the Ring, SummerSlam, Survivor Series, and Royal Rumble), and were sold at a lower cost. In Your House 11: Buried Alive took place on October 20, 1996 at the Market Square Arena in Indianapolis, Indiana. It was aptly named as it featured the first-ever Buried Alive match held by the promotion. In The Mortician: The Story of Paul Bearer, Bruce Prichard revealed that the vignettes for the show were shot in Fairfield, Connecticut and with both The Undertaker and Mankind along with Paul Bearer did "Graveyard Promos" to build up the hype of the event. On Something Else to Wrestle with Bruce Prichard, Bruce Prichard revealed that the original match was supposed to be a Graveyard match in an actual graveyard, but was moved to Market Square Arena for attendance viewing.

Storylines
In Your House 11: Buried Alive comprised professional wrestling matches involving different wrestlers from pre-existing scripted feuds and storylines that played out on Monday Night Raw and other World Wrestling Federation (WWF) television programs. Wrestlers portrayed a villain or a hero as they followed a series of events that built tension, and culminated in a wrestling match.

The focal point of the event was the feud between The Undertaker and Mankind, that had been evolving since the summer of 1996 when the Undertaker's manager Paul Bearer turned on him and joined forces with Mankind. The two had already fought each other in a Boiler Room Brawl at the 1996 SummerSlam, during which Bearer sided with Mankind. In order to settle the storyline between the two the "Buried Alive match" was devised, playing off the characters of both the Undertaker and Paul Bearer as the only way to win the match was to throw their opponent into an open grave and then shovel soil on the grave.

Event
During the event, Jim Ross, who was in the middle of a storyline where he turned heel as a commentator, grew increasingly irritated as his headset went through multiple technical difficulties throughout the event. Several times he would comment that the WWF was trying to keep him from voicing his opinions, all of which was part of the storyline.

Also notable is the debut of Stone Cold Steve Austin's "Hell Frozen Over" music, featuring the infamous shattered glass at the beginning. The shattered glass at the beginning along with the tune that originated from "Hell Frozen Over" would become part of Austin's character for the rest of his career.

During the main event, Crush, Justin Bradshaw, Goldust, Hunter Hearst Helmsley, and The Executioner were helping  Mankind to bury The Undertaker alive, only to be scared away by the sound of thunder after they were done.

Aftermath
The Undertaker would later "return from the grave" following the supposed burial at In Your House, and continue his storyline against Mankind and Paul Bearer, including a match at the subsequent In Your House show where he defeated the Executioner in an Armageddon Rules match. The feud with Mankind continued off and on for several years, including a very high-profile Hell in a Cell at the 1998 King of the Ring.

Owing to his victory over Vader, Sid earned a match against WWF World Heavyweight Champion Shawn Michaels in the main event of the 1996 Survivor Series, in which Sid won his first WWF World Heavyweight Championship.

Results

Other on-screen personnel

References

11: Buried Alive
Events in Indianapolis
1996 in Indiana
Professional wrestling in Indianapolis
1996 WWF pay-per-view events
October 1996 events in the United States
The Undertaker